The Titii or Tithii were a small and obscure Celtiberian people, whose lands were located along the middle Jalón and upper Tajuña valleys, somewhere between Alhama de Aragón in Zaragoza and Molina de Aragón in Guadalajara provinces.

Origins 

The Titii were of Celtic origin, whose ancestors probably migrated to the Iberian Peninsula around the 4th Century BC, and part of the Celtiberians. There is an overwhelming amount of evidence that the ancestors of the Celtiberian groups were installed in the Meseta area of the Iberian Peninsula from at least 1000 BC and probably much earlier.

Culture 

Due to the lack of extensive archaeological surveys, no Iron Age settlements connected with this people were ever found in the area.  Nevertheless, analysis of numismatic finds from the Jalón-Tajuña (ancient Tagonius) area has led some archaeologists to relate the mints of three unknown Celtiberian towns – Aratis/Aratikos, Titum, and Titiakos – with the Titii, pointing Titum as their presumed capital.

The town of Aratis/Aratikos was identified in 2014 with the Iron Age site of Castejón I – El Romeral at Aranda de Moncayo in Zaragoza province.

History 

Often mentioned in the ancient sources as allies or clients of the Belli, they were subjected to Turboletae raids in the 3rd century BC and seem to have submitted by Carthage just prior to the Second Punic War, but what role they played in that conflict remains obscure.  However, during the Celtiberian Wars of the 2nd century BC they sided with the Belli and Arevaci against Rome, being recorded as one of the signatories of the peace treaty with Tiberius Sempronius Gracchus in 179 BC.  
The Titii also retained their political autonomy until being defeated alongside the Belli in 142 BC by Proconsul Quintus Caecilius Metellus Macedonicus and later included into Hispania Citerior province in 134 BC, and thereafter cease to be mentioned by the sources.
After 72 BC however, they merged with the Belli, Uraci and Cratistii tribes to create the Late Celtiberian people of romanized southern Celtiberia, losing their tribal identity in the process.

See also 
Celtiberian confederacy
Celtiberian script
Celtiberian Wars
Numantine War
Pre-Roman peoples of the Iberian Peninsula

Notes

References

 Ángel Montenegro et alii, Historia de España 2 - colonizaciones y formación de los pueblos prerromanos (1200-218 a.C), Editorial Gredos, Madrid (1989) 
 Alberto J. Lorrio, Los Celtíberos, Universidad Complutense de Madrid, Murcia (1997) 
 Francisco Burillo Mozota, Los Celtíberos, etnias y estados, Crítica, Barcelona (1998, revised edition 2007)

Further reading

Aedeen Cremin, The Celts in Europe, Sydney, Australia: Sydney Series in Celtic Studies 2, Centre for Celtic Studies, University of Sydney (1992) .
Dáithí Ó hÓgáin, The Celts: A History, The Collins Press, Cork (2002) 

John T. Koch (ed.), Celtic Culture: A Historical Encyclopedia, ABC-CLIO Inc., Santa Barbara, California (2006) , 1-85109-445-8

External links
http://www.celtiberia.net

Pre-Roman peoples of the Iberian Peninsula
Celtic tribes of the Iberian Peninsula 
Ancient peoples of Spain